"Frick Park Market" is a song by American hip hop recording independent artist Mac Miller. It serves as the lead single from his debut album Blue Slide Park. It was released digitally on August 18, 2011 along with an accompanying music video.

Background
The song is named after Frick Park Market, a food store in Mac Miller's hometown of Pittsburgh, Pennsylvania at which the rapper once worked. The name coincides with the album title "Blue Slide Park" which is the name of one of the playgrounds in nearby Frick Park. The official music video to the song was filmed at the store. As of May 18, 2020 the official music video has had over 42 million views on YouTube.

Chart performance
The song entered the Billboard Hot 100 chart at number 60 on September 3, as well as reaching numbers 34 and 3 on the US Digital and, 
Top Heatseekers charts respectively. The single has sold over 150,000 units in the US.

Track listing

Charts

Certifications

References

2011 singles
2011 songs
Mac Miller songs
Rostrum Records singles
Songs written by Mac Miller